The Commander of the Royal Netherlands Army (C-LAS, Dutch: Commandant Landstrijdkrachten) is the executive commander of the Royal Netherlands Army and reports directly to the Chief of Defence. The Commander of the Royal Netherlands Army is statutorily a three-star general. The current C-LAS is Air Defense Artillery Lieutenant General Martin Wijnen.

History of the C-LAS

The position of C-LAS was created on 5 September 2005 as part of a thorough reorganization within the Dutch Ministry of Defence in which the staffs (military and civilian) were reduced in size and an entire organizational layer was dropped. Before September 2005 the commanding officer of the Army was the Bevelhebber der Landstrijdkrachten (abbreviated BLS; the term also translates into English as Commander of the Royal Netherlands Army).

Officeholders

Commanders of the Royal Netherlands Army (Bevelhebber der Landstrijdkrachten)
 1954 - 1957 General Ben Hasselman
 1957 - 1962 Lieutenant General Gillis le Fèvre de Montigny
 1962 - 1963 Lieutenant General A.V. van den Wall Bake
 1964 - 1968 Lieutenant General Frans van der Veen
 1968 - 1971 Lieutenant General Willem van Rijn
 1972 - 1973 Lieutenant General Gerrit IJsselstein
 1973 - 1977 Lieutenant General Jan van der Slikke
 1977 - 1980 Lieutenant General Cor de Jager
 1980 - 1985 Lieutenant General Han Roos
 1985 - 1988 Lieutenant General Peter Graaff
 1988 - 1992 Lieutenant General Rien Wilmink
 1992 - 1996 Lieutenant General Hans Couzy
 1996 - 2001 Lieutenant General Maarten Schouten
 2001 - 2002 Lieutenant General Ad van Baal
 2002 - 2005 Lieutenant General Marcel Urlings

Commander of the Royal Netherlands Army

Deputy Commanders
Major General Lex Oostendorp (5 September 2005 – 25 November 2007)
Major General Marcel van den Broek (26 November 2007 – March 2010)
Major General Mart de Kruif (March 2010 – October 2011)
Major General Marc van Uhm (October 2011 – January 2016)
Major General Martin Wijnen (January 2016 – July 2017)
Major General Kees Matthijssen (July 2017 – October 2019)
Major General Rob Jeulink (October 2019 - present)

See also
 Commander of the Royal Netherlands Air Force
 Commander of the Royal Netherlands Navy

References

External links
Official website at the Dutch Ministry of Defence

Royal Netherlands Army
Netherlands
C
Military ranks of the Royal Netherlands Army